Milobadz may refer to the following places in Poland:
Miłobądz, Pomeranian Voivodeship (north Poland)
Miłobądź, Pomeranian Voivodeship (north Poland)
Miłobądz, West Pomeranian Voivodeship (north-west Poland)
Miłobądź, West Pomeranian Voivodeship (north-west Poland)